Blackwelder may refer to:

People

Eliot Blackwelder (1880–1969), American geologist
Myra Blackwelder (born 1955), American professional golfer
Richard E. Blackwelder (1909−2001), American entomologist

in geology

Blackwelder Glacier, glacier in Antarctica.
Mount Blackwelder, Antarctic mountain.
Blackwelder Mountains, in Nunavut

in other uses:

Blackwelder, a musical group fronted by former Primal Fear singer Ralf Scheepers